Michael E. McMahon (born September 12, 1957) is an American politician and attorney serving as the District Attorney for Richmond County, which is coextensive with Staten Island.

Early life, education and career
McMahon is a lifelong resident of Staten Island. He is of German and Irish descent. He grew up in the Stapleton neighborhood on the North Shore and attended parochial schools. He graduated from New York University in 1979, later obtaining a J.D. degree from New York Law School. He then worked for Democratic State Assembly members Eric Vitaliano and Elizabeth Connelly. He joined the staff of City Councilman Jerome X. O'Donovan, whom he succeeded in the Council. Prior to being elected to public office, McMahon worked as a partner at O'Leary, McMahon & Spero law firm in Staten Island. Since 1981 he is member of the student Corps Saxo-Borussia Heidelberg.

New York City Council
McMahon served as the Chair of the New York City Council's Sanitation & Solid Waste Management Committee focusing on minimizing the use of trucks to transport garbage and also more evenly distributing the load of waste processing across the five boroughs.

U.S. House of Representatives

Committee assignments
Committee on Foreign Affairs
Subcommittee on Europe
Subcommittee on Terrorism, Nonproliferation, and Trade
Subcommittee on the Middle East and South Asia
Committee on Transportation and Infrastructure
Subcommittee on Aviation
Subcommittee on Coast Guard and Maritime Transportation
Subcommittee on Railroads, Pipelines, and Hazardous Materials

Political positions
In November 2009, McMahon voted along with 38 other Democrats against the Affordable Health Care for America Act and against the Patient Protection and Affordable Care Act in March 2010. 
He was the only member of the New York City delegation to do so, and was only one of two New York Democrats, the other being Michael Arcuri, to vote against it.

Political campaigns

2008

On May 28, 2008, the Staten Island Democratic Committee endorsed McMahon to run for the Congressional seat in New York's 13th congressional district being vacated by retiring 12-year incumbent Republican Vito Fossella. On September 9, 2008 McMahon defeated opponent Steve Harrison in the Democratic Party primary with 75% of votes to Harrison's 25%.  Earlier, on June 11, 2008, McMahon had been endorsed by the city's 12 Democratic congressmen.

The 13th had long been considered to be the most conservative district of the 13 that divided New York City. It was based in Staten Island, which is the base of the city's Republican Party. Although Democrats have a 17-point edge in registration, its voters are somewhat conservative on social issues and matters regarding "law and order", which kept Republicans in the seat for over a quarter century. However, the Republicans had considerable difficulty finding a replacement for Fossella on the ballot, eventually settling on former state assemblyman Robert Straniere. As a result, nearly all major pundits believed McMahon was almost certain to win the seat.  

In the November election, McMahon won in a landslide, taking 61 percent of the vote to Straniere's 33 percent.  With his victory, New York City's congressional delegation became entirely Democratic for the first time in 76 years. This occurred despite the fact that John McCain narrowly carried Staten Island in the presidential election; a Democratic presidential candidate has carried Staten Island only four times since 1952.

2010

McMahon was challenged by Republican and Conservative Party nominee Michael Grimm, a former FBI Special Agent, and Libertarian nominee Tom Vendittelli. Grimm won the election, defeating McMahon. He was one of a number of freshman Democrats who lost reelection in the GOP landslide of 2010.

2015

McMahon had publicly expressed a "serious interest" for retaking his old seat, now numbered as the 11th District, in the 2015 special election to replace his successor Michael Grimm.  Grimm, who defeated McMahon for reelection in 2010, announced his plans to resign in January after pleading guilty to a felony tax evasion charge on December 23, 2014.  McMahon, however, declined to run, deciding to enter the race for Staten Island (Richmond County) District Attorney, and the Democratic nomination went to New York City Councilman Vincent J. Gentile, who was from the Brooklyn portion of the district.

In November, McMahon defeated Republican candidate Joan Illuzzi for Staten Island District Attorney.

References

External links

Michael McMahon for U.S. Congress official campaign site
 

|-

|-

|-

1957 births
21st-century American politicians
American people of German descent
American people of Irish descent
Democratic Party members of the United States House of Representatives from New York (state)
Living people
Monsignor Farrell High School alumni
New York City Council members
New York University School of Law alumni
Politicians from Staten Island
Richmond County District Attorneys
Members of Congress who became lobbyists